Jason Michael Wade (born July 5, 1980) is an American musician best known as the lead vocalist and guitarist of the alternative rock band Lifehouse.

Career

Lifehouse 
At the age of 15, Wade co-founded Lifehouse (originally called Blyss) with neighbors Sergio Andrade and Rick Woolstenhulme. The band rose to fame when their debut album, No Name Face, was released in 2000. As of 2019, Lifehouse has sold more than 15 million singles and albums worldwide.

Solo work 
Wade recorded a cover of "You Belong to Me" for the 2001 movie Shrek and its accompanying soundtrack.

He released a solo album entitled Paper Cuts in 2017. His followup LP, Ode to Silence, was released December 31, 2021.

ØZWALD 
In 2018, Wade formed a band called ØZWALD with Lifehouse touring guitarist Steve Stout as a side project. The duo have released numerous singles, an EP of covers, and six full-length albums: Sweet Delirium, Born in a State, Head Movies, For Polly Anna, Young Suburban Minds, and Artificial Odyssey.

Personal life
Wade's parents are divorced. After the divorce, he and his mother moved to Seattle. According to Wade, he used the Lifehouse song "You and Me" to propose to his then-girlfriend, Braeden, whom he married in 2001.

Discography

References

External links

LifehouseMusic.com

1980 births
Living people
20th-century American singers
21st-century American singers
Alternative rock guitarists
Alternative rock singers
American alternative rock musicians
American Christians
American male guitarists
American male singers
American male songwriters
American performers of Christian music
American rock guitarists
American rock singers
American rock songwriters
DreamWorks Records artists
Geffen Records artists
Guitarists from California
Guitarists from Washington (state)
Lifehouse (band) members
Musicians from Seattle
People from Camarillo, California
People from Port Orchard, Washington
People from Seattle
Singers from California
Singers from Washington (state)
Songwriters from California
Songwriters from Washington (state)